David John Mattingly, FBA (born 18 May 1958) is an archaeologist and historian of the Roman world. He is currently Professor of Roman Archaeology at the University of Leicester.

Biography 
Mattingly's grandfather, Harold Mattingly, was Keeper of the Department of Coins and Medals at the British Museum, and his father, Harold B. Mattingly, was Professor of Ancient History at Leeds University. He received a Bachelor of Arts (BA) in history at the University of Manchester, and later a Doctor of Philosophy (PhD) from the same university, under the supervision of Barri Jones. His doctoral thesis was titled "Tripolitania: A comparative study of a Roman frontier province", and was submitted in 1984. He was then a British Academy Post-doctoral fellow at the Institute of Archaeology, in Oxford until 1989. He was then Assistant Professor at the University of Michigan in the United States. At Leicester University he was first Lecturer, then Reader (1995), and most recently Professor (since 1998).

In 2003, he was elected a Fellow of the British Academy (FBA), the United Kingdom's national academy for the humanities and social sciences.

Scholarship
Mattingly's main area of research is Roman North Africa, especially Libya and Tunisia, though he has also conducted research on Britain, Italy and Jordan. His emphasis has largely been social and economic, and centres on the study of rural settlement, farming technology and the economy; post-colonial approaches to Roman imperialism; Roman military frontiers and the study of native society beyond those frontiers. 
His most recent book is Imperialism, Power and Identity: Experiencing the Roman Empire.

He is an active field archaeologist, and is currently directing several expeditions examining the archaeology of the Fazzan and the Ghadames oasis in Libya.

Published works

 Imperialism, Power and Identity: Experiencing the Roman Empire. (2010).
 The Archaeology of Fazzan: Volume 3, Excavations carried out by C M Daniels. (2010) (ed. D. Mattingly).
 Archaeology and Desertification: the Wadi Faynan Landscape Survey, southern Jordan (2007), (with G Barker, D Gilbertson et al.)
 The Archaeology of Fazzan. Volume 2, Site Gazetteer, Pottery and Other Survey Finds (2007), (edited by D Mattingly).
 The Cambridge Dictionary of Classical Civilization (2006). (edited with G Shipley, J Vanderspoel and L Foxhall).
 The Libyan Desert: Natural Resources and Cultural Heritage (2006).(edited with S McLaren, E Savage, Y al-Fasatwi and K Gadgood).
 The Archaeology of Fazzan: Volume 1 (2003) edited by D. Mattingly
 Leptiminus (Lamta): Report no. 2 (2001), (with L Stirling and N Ben Lazreg)
 Leptiminus (Lamta): a Roman port city in Tunisia, Report no. 1.(1992) (with N Ben Lazreg and contributions from others)
 Economies beyond Agriculture in the Classical World (2001) (edited with J Salmon)
 Life, Death and Entertainment in Ancient Rome. (1999), (edited with D Potter)
 Dialogues in Roman Imperialism. Power, Discourse and Discrepant Experience in the Roman Empire (1997), (editor David Mattingly)
 Farming the Desert. The UNESCO Libyan Valleys Archaeological Survey. Volume 2, Gazetteer and Pottery (1996), (edited. DJ Mattingly)
 Tripolitania. Batsford, London (1995)

References

Debrett's People of Today 

1958 births
English archaeologists
University of Michigan faculty
Academics of the University of Leicester
Living people
Fellows of the British Academy
Historians of ancient Rome